Postal service may refer to:

 Mail, or post, a system for physically transporting postcards, letters, and parcels
 List of postal entities, including countries' postal services 
 List of national postal services
 List of postal services abroad in the late 19th and early 20th century
 The Postal Service, an American music group

See also

Post Office (disambiguation)
Postal (disambiguation)
Post (disambiguation)
Mail (disambiguation)